Oliver Marach and Mate Pavić were the two-time defending champions from when the event was last held in 2019 but lost in the first round to Tomislav Brkić and Nikola Ćaćić.

John Peers and Michael Venus won the title, defeating Simone Bolelli and Máximo González in the final, 6–2, 7–5.

Seeds

Draw

Draw

References

External Links
Main Draw

2021 ATP Tour
2021 in Swiss sport
Doubles